"From Above" is a song with music by Ben Folds and lyrics by Nick Hornby. It was the lead single from their 2010 collaboration album Lonely Avenue. The song features guest vocals from Australian singer-songwriter Kate Miller-Heidke.

Music video
The music video for the single is animated, with the characters from the song being drawn in a book and the characters move around on the page, acting out the story of the song. The video was directed by Julius Pretite of The Simpsons.

References

Ben Folds songs
Nonesuch Records singles
2010 songs
2010 singles
Songs written by Ben Folds